Julimes   is a town and seat of the municipality of Julimes, in the northern Mexican state of Chihuahua. As of 2010, the town of Julimes had a population of 1,795, up from 1,756 as of 2005.

The community is adjacent to the east bank of a north-flowing section of the Rio Conchos.

References

Rio Conchos
Populated places in Chihuahua (state)